A moonquake is the lunar equivalent of an earthquake.

Moonquake may also refer to:

 "Moon Quake", a bonus track on some versions of the 2015 album Moonbuilding 2703 AD by The Orb
 "Moonquake", a 1959 episode of TV series Men into Space

See also
Moon Quake Lake, a fictional film within Annie (2014 film), and a song